Bulletproof Heart is the ninth studio album by Jamaican singer, songwriter and model Grace Jones, released on October 13, 1989. The album, co-produced by Chris Stanley, would be Jones' last studio album for 19 years, until the release of Hurricane in 2008.

Background, production and release
The album came after Jones' short break from recording music, during which she would again focus on acting, appearing in the all-star Straight to Hell and Mary Lambert's Siesta. On Bulletproof Heart Jones would work with producer Chris Stanley, who at that time had become her first husband. Stanley co-produced the album with her, co-wrote the majority of songs and delivered guest vocals on "Don't Cry Freedom". Three tracks were produced/co-produced by Robert Clivillés and David Cole of C+C Music Factory, who would achieve a global success with the dance track "Gonna Make You Sweat (Everybody Dance Now)" in 1990, and Jonathan Elias. Musically, Bulletproof Heart continued the commercial pop sound of the previous record, Inside Story, showcasing material heavily influenced by synthesizers, drums and electronic percussion. The CD version of the album included two additional songs, which were absent on the vinyl pressing. Although Jones has always stayed musically active, Bulletproof Heart would be her last studio album for almost two decades. None of her 1990s comeback attempts materialised and her next album, Hurricane, was eventually released in 2008. A remastered, copy protected edition of the album was released in 2004 on EMI Records, and came with two more bonus tracks.

Singles
Only two singles were released from Bulletproof Heart. "Love on Top of Love" was chosen as the lead single and received numerous remixes. It met with limited success and only reached modest positions in Italy and the Netherlands. However, the 12" remix of the song, subtitled "Killer Kiss", was a significant club hit in the US.

Jones' cover of "Amado Mio", a song from the 1946 film Gilda, was released as the final single in 1990. It also made little impact, still reaching the top 40 in Italy, but placing at the bottom of the German and UK charts.

Reception

Bulletproof Heart met with unflattering reception in both critical and commercial performance. In his review music critic Robert Christgau wrote that the songs "proclaim her vulnerability and/or softness of orifice" and according to him the result is "incongruous". AllMusic gave the album two out of five stars. The commercial performance of the album was also poor: it peaked at number 55 in Germany, and number 108 in Australia, but failed to enter charts elsewhere, thus becoming the lowest-charting of all her studio albums and one of her least successful offerings.

Track listing

Notes
 The remastered 2004 CD reissue of Bulletproof Heart has the same track order as the original 1989 LP release of the album, with "Dream" and "Don't Cry Freedom" appearing as tracks 11 and 12 respectively.
 Freedom is not credited as a feature on the album's tracklist.

Personnel

Josh Abbey – sound mixing
Alan – horns, keyboards, percussion
Jerry Bennett – drum programming
Jay Berliner – flamenco guitar
Jocelyn Brown – backing vocals
Danny Browny – guitar
Francesco Centeno – bass
Robert Clivillés – production, drum programming, percussion, sound mixing, sound editing
David Cole – production, arrangements, keyboards, synthesizers, sound mixing, sound editing
Dominic Cortese – accordion
Ricky Crespo – sound editing
Craig Derry – backing vocals
Tyrone Downie – keyboards
Jonathan Elias – production, arrangements, drum programming, keyboards, synthesizer programming
Jeffrey Fey – design
Chris Floberg – sound mixing
Ray Foote – FX guitar
Sherman Foote – drum programming, synthesizer programming, sound engineering, sound mixing
Chris Fosdick – vocal effects
Freedom – rap
David Gennaro – vocals engineering
Greg Gorman – inside photography
Gordon Gottlieb – percussion
Jean-Paul Goude – cover art

Diva Gray – backing vocals
Steve "Griff" Griffin – recording engineering
Lani Groves – backing vocals
Clive Hunt – bass, horns, keyboards
Chip Jenkins – synth programming
Grace Jones – production, arrangements, vocals
Curtis King Jr. – backing vocals
Alex Lasarenko – keyboards, piano, synth bass, arrangement
Jim "Bonzai" Lyon – mix engineering
Willie Menendez – narration
Jim Nicholson – synth programming, sound engineering
Clifford Pemsler – synth programming, sound engineering
Janice Pendarvis – backing vocals
Lenny Pickett – saxophone
Carl Pitterson – drum programming, keyboards, percussion, sound engineering, sound mixing
Tom Regis – drum programming
José Rodriguez – mastering
Paul Seymour – vocals engineering
Ira Siegel – groove guitar
Frank Simms – backing vocals
Chris Stanley – production, keyboards, bass, guest vocal
Vanessee Thomas – backing vocals
Dave Tofani – tenor saxophone
George Victory – guitar, bass guitar, rhythm guitar, keyboards
Martha Wash – backing vocals
Kenny Williams – backing vocals

Charts

Release history

References

External links
 Bulletproof Heart on AllMusic
 Bulletproof Heart on Discogs
 Bulletproof Heart on Rate Your Music

1989 albums
Dance-pop albums by Jamaican artists
Grace Jones albums